Kappa Alpha Psi, an international historically Black fraternity, has chartered over 400 undergraduate chapters in the continental United States, plus alumni and international chapters. The fraternity has over 150,000 members and is divided into twelve provinces (districts/regions), with each chapter under the aegis of a province.

Following its inception at Indiana University in 1911, the fraternity expanded to charter at the University of Illinois (now, University of Illinois at Urbana-Champaign) (1913), University of Iowa (1914), and Wilberforce University,  Lincoln University (Pennsylvania) (the second oldest historically black university), Ohio State University (1915). The first chapter in the South came in 1919, at Meharry Medical College — Kappa chapter. By 1921, the fraternity had grown to 17 active chapters. Its decennial also saw the fraternity divided into supervisory districts — the forerunner of provinces, and installation of the Omicron chapter at Columbia University, its first at an Ivy League university.

Collegiate/Undergraduate chapters

Single letter chapters

Chapters beginning with "Alpha"

Chapters beginning with "Beta"

Chapters beginning with "Gamma"

Chapters beginning with "Delta"

Chapters beginning with "Epsilon"

Chapters beginning with "Zeta"

Chapters beginning with "Eta"

Chapters beginning with "Theta"

{FratChapter|Chapter Name=Theta Gamma|Founded=1975|School=Eastern Illinois University|Location=Charleston,IL|Status=Active|Reference=}}

Chapters beginning with "Iota"

Chapters beginning with "Kappa"

Chapters beginning with "Lambda"

Chapters beginning with "Mu"

Chapters beginning with "Nu"

Chapters beginning with "Xi"

Chapters beginning with "Omicron"

Chapters beginning with "Pi"

Chapters beginning with "Rho"

Alumni chapters

Notes

References

Sources

 
 
 
 
 
 
 *
 
 
 
 
 
 

Chapters
Lists of chapters of United States student societies by society